USNS Kane (T-AGS-27) was a  acquired by the United States Navy and delivered to Military Sealift Command in 1967. Kane spent her career performing oceanographic surveys.

Kane was launched 20 November 1965 by the Christy Corporation, Sturgeon Bay, Wisconsin; sponsored by Mrs. Harold T. Duetermann, wife of Vice Admiral Deutermann; assigned to Military Sea Transportation Service; and placed in service 26 May 1967 for scientific operations in the Atlantic. Bruce Heezen was the chief scientist on Kanes maiden research voyage, a four-month survey of fracture zones to determine what route and through what periods of geologic time North America separated from Europe and Africa. Cartographer Marie Tharp was also on board and worked on revising the North Atlantic physiographic diagram while also producing a new physiographic map of the Pacific Ocean floor.

Besides conducting coastal hydrographic and oceanographic surveys, Kane also tended small survey craft, helicopters, and Marine Corps survey teams. She was capable of compiling and printing finished charts on the spot to meet fleet and landing force requirements and had accommodations for scientists.

Decommissioning and fate 
Kane was deactivated in Malaysia 14 March 2001, and transferred to the Republic of Turkey, renamed TGC Çandarli (A-588), joining her sister ship, ex-Silas Bent which was renamed TCG Çeșme (A-599).

References

External links 

 (Misnamed as USNS Elisha Kent Kane (T-AGS-27) on NavSource)

 

Ships built in Sturgeon Bay, Wisconsin
1967 ships
Cold War auxiliary ships of the United States
Survey ships of the United States Navy
Oceanographic research ships of the United States Navy
Ships transferred from the United States Navy to the Turkish Navy